The first edition of the Indian music television series Coke Studio, titled as Coke Studio @ MTV, commenced airing on 17 June 2011 and concluded on 12 August 2011. The season was produced by Leslie Lewis.

Featured artists 
The list of performers features both popular and traditional musicians hailing from various parts of India.

Vocalists 

 Advaita
 Akriti Kakkar
 Benny Dayal
 Bombay Jayashri
 Bondo
 Chinna Ponnu
 Divya Lewis
 Harshdeep Kaur
 KK
 Kailash Kher
 Khagen Gogoi
 Mathangi Rajshekhar
 Mausam Gogoi
 Megha Dalton
 Mustafa Bros
 Pankhi Dutta
 Papon
 Parthiv Gohil
 Raghupati Dixit
 Ramya Iyer
 Richa Sharma
 Sabri Brothers
 Sanjeev Thomas
 Saurav Moni
 Shaan
 Shafqat Amanat Ali
 Shankar Mahadevan
 Shruti Pathak
 Sunidhi Chauhan
 Suzzane D'Mello
 Tochi Raina
 Ustad Rashid Khan
 Wadali Brothers

Episodes 
Each hour-long episode of the Coke Studio @ MTV featured six to seven songs and a diverse mix of music from alternative genres including Carnatic and Hindustani, compositions by new musicians, recreated Bollywood tracks, and a special song created on the programme.

Notes and references

Notes

References

External links 
 

Indian television series
Coke Studio (Indian TV program)
2011 Indian television series debuts